Józef Daniel Krzeptowski (29 July 1921 – 13 August 2002) was a Polish skier. He competed at the 1948 Winter Olympics and the 1956 Winter Olympics.

References

1921 births
2002 deaths
Polish male cross-country skiers
Polish male Nordic combined skiers
Polish male ski jumpers
Olympic cross-country skiers of Poland
Olympic Nordic combined skiers of Poland
Olympic ski jumpers of Poland
Cross-country skiers at the 1948 Winter Olympics
Nordic combined skiers at the 1948 Winter Olympics
Nordic combined skiers at the 1956 Winter Olympics
Ski jumpers at the 1948 Winter Olympics
People from Inowrocław
20th-century Polish people